Events from the year 1790 in Scotland.

Incumbents

Law officers 
 Lord Advocate – Robert Dundas of Arniston
 Solicitor General for Scotland – Robert Blair

Judiciary 
 Lord President of the Court of Session – Lord Succoth
 Lord Justice General – The Viscount Stormont
 Lord Justice Clerk – Lord Braxfield

Events 
 16 June–28 July – British general election gives Pitt an increased majority.
 28 June – Forth and Clyde Canal opened.
 October – Pladda Lighthouse first illuminated.
 Balblair distillery at Edderton founded.
 Caerlee Mill at Innerleithen completed, the oldest woollen mill in the Scottish Borders.
 New Ardkinglas Castle built.
 Construction of Gosford House to the design of Robert Adam for Francis Wemyss-Charteris is begun.
 The mineral element strontium is discovered near Strontian by chemists Adair Crawford and William Cruickshank.
 Approximate date – Whaligoe steps cut.

Births 
 3 March – Robert Story, Church of Scotland minister and writer (died 1859)
 25 October – Robert Stirling, Church of Scotland minister and inventor of the Stirling engine (died 1878)
 29 October – David Napier, marine engineer (died 1869 in London)
 James Clow, Presbyterian minister and settler in Melbourne (died 1861 in Australia)
 Approximate date – Mary Diana Dods, writer as "David Lyndsay", later known as "Walter Sholto Douglas" (died 1830 in France)

Deaths 
 5 February – William Cullen, physician and chemist (born 1710)
 4 March – Flora MacDonald, Jacobite (born 1722)
 17 July – Adam Smith, economist and philosopher (born 1723)
 24 November – Robert Henry, historian and Church of Scotland minister (born 1718)

The arts
 Catholic priest Alexander Geddes writes the poem Linton: a Tweedside Pastoral, Carmen Seculare pro Gallica Gente in praise of the French Revolution.
 Kirkmichael musician Robert Petrie publishes several Highland music pieces with "Mrs. Small of Dirnanean" in their title. The compositions are published in "Petrie's Collection of Strathspey Reels & County Dances".

References 

 
Scotland
1790s in Scotland